Enevold Frederik Adolf Sørensen (21 September 1850 – 1920) was a Danish editor, politician and minister. 

He was interior minister in the Cabinet of Deuntzer and kultus minister in the Cabinet of J.C. Christensen I and II, the Cabinet of Neergaard I and the Cabinet of Holstein-Ledreborg as a member of the Venstre Reform Party. As interior minister he instituted an extensive tax reform.

From 1910 to 1918 he was one of the king's appointed members of the Landsting.

Danish Interior Ministers
Danish Kultus Ministers
19th-century Danish politicians
20th-century Danish politicians
19th-century Danish newspaper editors
1850 births
1920 deaths
Members of the Landsting (Denmark)
Members of the Folketing